Shashi Kant Seth or S. K. Seth (born 28 August 1931) was an Indian Judge and Chief Justice of the Himachal Pradesh High Court.

Career
Mr. Seth completed M.A., LL.B. and was enrolled as an Advocate in 1962 and started practice in the Madhya Pradesh High Court. He was the empaneled lawyer of State Electricity Board. He served as Standing Counsel for Madhya Pradesh Electricity Board and University of Sagar before various Tribunals and Subordinate Court. Seth appeared in different High Courts of India including the Calcutta High Court as an advocate. He was appointed additional Judge of Madhya Pradesh High Court on 27 November 1978 and became the permanent Judge in 1982. On 22 August 1993 he was elevated in the post of the Chief Justice of Himachal Pradesh High Court. Justice Seth retired on 28 August 1993.

References

1931 births
20th-century Indian judges
Judges of the Madhya Pradesh High Court
Chief Justices of the Himachal Pradesh High Court
20th-century Indian lawyers
21st-century Indian judges
Living people